Several past and present states have declared themselves socialist states or in the process of building socialism. The majority of self-declared socialist countries have been Marxist–Leninist or inspired by it, following the model of the Soviet Union or some form of people's or national democracy. They share a common definition of socialism and they refer to themselves as socialist states on the road to communism with a leading vanguard party structure, hence they are often called communist states. Meanwhile, the countries in the non-Marxist–Leninist category represent a wide variety of different interpretations of the term socialism and in many cases the countries do not define what they mean by it. Modern uses of the term socialism are wide in meaning and interpretation.

Because a sovereign state is a different entity from the political party that governs that state at any given time, a country may be ruled by a socialist party without the country itself claiming to be socialist or the socialist party being written into the constitution. This has occurred in both one-party and multi-party political systems. In particular, there are numerous cases of social democratic and democratic socialist parties winning elections in liberal democratic states and ruling for a number of terms until a different party wins the elections. While socialist parties have won many elections around the world and most elections in the Nordic countries, none of those countries have adopted socialism as a state ideology or written the party into the constitution.

Several countries with liberal democratic constitutions mention socialism. India is a democracy that has been governed by non-socialist parties on many occasions, but its constitution makes references to socialism. Certain other countries such as Hungary, Myanmar, and Poland have constitutions that make references to their communist and socialist past by recognizing or condemning it, but without claiming to be socialist in the present.

Overview
Self-identification is the only criterion used by the list, therefore it includes all countries that have claimed to be socialist, even if their claims are disputed. All countries that have not claimed to be socialist are excluded, even in cases where certain outside observers regarded those countries as socialist. Mao Zedong and the Communist Party of China considered the Taiping Heavenly Kingdom to be a proto-communist state, although the kingdom never declared itself socialist, hence it is not included on this list. The list includes countries that assert in their constitutions that they are based on socialism, regardless of their economic or political system. It does not list countries that do not have constitutional references to socialism as socialist states, even in cases where the government is currently run by a socialist party or other left-wing (centre-left and far-left) parties. Inversely, countries that do maintain constitutional references to socialism are listed, even when those countries are governed by non-socialist parties. The list is best understood as a list of countries that explicitly claim to be socialist and it does not reflect the actual economic systems themselves.

Current socialist states

Marxist–Leninist states

Non-Marxist–Leninist states

Countries with constitutional references to socialism

Socialist territories with limited recognition
These are territories that have claimed independence or autonomy and have declared themselves socialist under some interpretation of the term. While these territories have created stable institutions of governance that have existed for a considerable period of time, they are not widely recognized as states by the international community and officially belong to other sovereign states under international law.
 Wa State (April 1989 – present)
 Rebel Zapatista Autonomous Municipalities (December 1994 – present)
 Autonomous Administration of North and East Syria (November 2013 – present)

Former socialist states

Marxist–Leninist states

Non-Marxist–Leninist states

Ephemeral socialist states
These are short-lived political entities that emerged during wars, revolutions, or unrest and declared themselves socialist under some interpretation of the term, but which did not survive long enough to create a stable government or achieve international recognition.
 Paris Commune (18 March 1871 – 28 May 1871)
 Republic of Guria (May 1902 – 10 January 1906)
 Strandzha Commune (18 August 1903 – 8 September 1903)
 (1917–1921)
 Crimean People's Republic (1917–1918)
 Soviet Republic of Soldiers and Fortress-Builders of Naissaar (December 1917 – February 1918)
 (1918–1919)
 (1918–1919)
 Finnish Socialist Workers' Republic (28 January 1918 – 29 April 1918)
 Odessa Soviet Republic (31 January 1918 – 13 March 1918)
 Donetsk–Krivoy Rog Soviet Republic (12 February 1918 – May 1918)
 Baku Commune (13 April 1918 - 25 July 1918) 
 Democratic Republic of Georgia (May 1918 – February 1921)
 People's State of Bavaria (8 November 1918 – 6 April 1919)
 Alsace Soviet Republic (9 November 1918 – 22 November 1918)
 Soldiers' Council of Strasbourg (9 November 1918 – 22 November 1918)
 Free Socialist Republic of Germany (9 November 1918 – 11 August 1919)
 Mainz Workers' and Soldiers' Council (9 November 1918 – 9 December 1918)
 Alsace-Lorraine Soviet Republic (10 November 1918 – 22 November 1918)
 Commune of the Working People of Estonia (29 November 1918 – 5 June 1919)
 Saxon Soviet Republic (November 1918 – March 1919)
 Latvian Socialist Soviet Republic (17 December 1918 – 13 January 1920)
 Hungarian People's Republic (16 November 1918 – 21 March 1919)
 Makhnovshchina (27 November 1918 – 28 August 1921)
 Würzburg Soviet Republic (1919)
 Bremen Soviet Republic (10 January 1919 – 4 February 1919)
 Lithuanian–Byelorussian Soviet Socialist Republic (27 February 1919 – 25 August 1919)
 Republic of Councils in Hungary (21 March 1919 – 6 August 1919)
 Mughan Soviet Republic (March 1919 – June 1919)
 Bavarian Soviet Republic (6 April 1919 – 3 May 1919)
 Crimean Socialist Soviet Republic (28 April 1919 – 26 June 1919)
 Bessarabian Soviet Socialist Republic (May 1919 – September 1919; 15 September 1924 – 18 September 1924)
 Slovak Soviet Republic (16 June 1919 – 7 July 1919)
 People's Republic of Mongolia (1921–1924)
 Persian Socialist Soviet Republic (9 June 1920 – September 1921)
 Galician Soviet Socialist Republic (8 July 1920 – 21 September 1920)
 Labin Republic (2 March 1921 – 8 April 1921)
 Hunan Soviet (September 1927 – October 1927)
  Guangzhou Commune (Guangzhou Soviet) (11 December 1927 – 13 December 1927)
 Soviet Zone (1927–1937)
 Korean People's Association in Manchuria (1929–1931)
 Nghệ-Tĩnh Soviet (1930–1931)
 Jiangxi–Fujian Soviet (1931–1934)
 (7 November 1931 – 22 September 1937)
 Socialist Republic of Chile (4 June 1932 – 2 October 1932)
 People's Revolutionary Government of the Republic of China (22 November 1933 – 13 January 1934)
 Xinjiang Clique (1934–1941)
 Asturian Socialist Republic (October 1934)
 Regional Defence Council of Aragon (1936–1937)
 Anarchist Aragon (1936–1939)
 Revolutionary Catalonia (1936–1939)
 Shaan-Gan-Ning Border Region (1937–1946)
 Finnish Democratic Republic (December 1939 – March 1940)
 Political Committee of National Liberation (10 March 1944 – 9 October 1944)
 Inner Mongolian People's Republic (9 September 1945 – 6 November 1945)
 People's Republic of Korea (1945–1946)
 Soviet Civil Administration (1945–1949)
 Liberated Zone (1946–1949)
 Azerbaijan People's Government (November 1945 – December 1946)
 Republic of Mahabad (22 January 1946 – 15 December 1946)
 Provisional People's Committee for North Korea (1946–1947)
 People's Committee of North Korea (1947–1948)
 Provisional Democratic Government of North Greece (1947–1949)
 Marquetalia Republic (1948–1964)
 Second East Turkestan Republic (12 November 1949 – 20 December 1949)
 People's Republic of Zanzibar and Pemba (1964)
 Republic of South Vietnam (8 June 1969 – 2 June 1976)
  People's Provisional Government of Vanuatu (1977–1978)
 People's Revolutionary Republic of Guinea (1979–1984)
 Junta of National Reconstruction (18 July 1979 – 10 January 1985)
 National Revolutionary Council of Gambia (30 July 1981 – 5 August 1981)
 Coalition Government of Democratic Kampuchea (22 June 1982 – 24 September 1993)
 National Council for the Revolution (1984–1987)
 Republic of Kuwait (4 August 1990 – 28 August 1990)
 Democratic Republic of Yemen (21 May 1994 – 7 July 1994)
 Provisional Government of National Union and National Salvation of Cambodia (11 July 1994 – 22 June 1998)

States with governing communist or socialist parties

There are multiple states with communist or socialist parties leading the government, sometimes together. Such states are not considered to be communist or socialist states because the countries themselves do not provide a constitutional role for their ruling socialist/communist parties or deem socialism a state ideology. This does not include socialist parties following social democracy which governed most of the Western world as part of the mainstream centre-left and refers to democratic socialist parties positioned to their left.

Examples of previous direct communist or socialist party rule in non-socialist multi-party democracies and constitutionally socialist states include:

 Australia (Australian Labor Party, 1904)
 Republic of San Marino (Sammarinese Communist Party, 1945–1957)
 Indonesia (Socialist Party, 1945–1948) 
 Union of Burma (Anti-Fascist People's Freedom League, 1948–1962)
 Israel (Mapai Socialist Party, 1948–1977)
 Republic of India (Indian National Congress, 1951–1977; 1980–1989; 1991–1996; 2004–2014)
 Republic of Uganda (Uganda People's Congress, 1960–1971; 1980–1985)
 Islamic Republic of Pakistan (Pakistan Peoples Party, 1970–1977; 1988–1990; 1993–1996; 2008–2013)
 Democratic Republic of Timor-Leste (Revolutionary Front for an Independent East Timor, 1975; 2002–2006; 2007; 2015–2018)
 Republic of Senegal (Socialist Party of Senegal, 1975–2000)
 Arab Republic of Egypt (National Democratic Party, 1978–2011)
 Republic of Vanuatu (Vanua'aku Pati, 1980–1994; 2009–2014)
 Republic of Nicaragua (Sandinista National Liberation Front, 1984–1990)
 People's Democratic Republic of Burkina Faso (Organization for Popular Democracy – Labour Movement and Congress for Democracy and Progress, 1987–1996; 1996–2014)
 Republic of Tunisia (Democratic Constitutional Rally, 1988–2011, Nidaa Tounes 2014–2019)
 Union of Soviet Socialist Republics (Communist Party of the Soviet Union, 1990–1991)
 Federal Democratic Republic of Ethiopia (Ethiopian People's Revolutionary Democratic Front, 1991–2019)
 Republic of Seychelles (Seychelles People's Progressive Front, People's Party and United Seychelles, 1991–2009; 2009–2018; 2018–2020)
 Republic of Mali (Alliance for Democracy in Mali and Rally for Mali, 1992–2002; 2012–2013; 2013–2020)
 (Socialist Party of Serbia, 1992–2000)
 Co-operative Republic of Guyana (People's Progressive Party, 1992–2015)
 Republic of Nepal (Communist Party of Nepal (Unified Marxist–Leninist), Unified Communist Party of Nepal (Maoist) and Nepal Communist Party, 1994–1998; 2008–2013; 2015–2017)
 Democratic Socialist Republic of Sri Lanka (Sri Lanka Freedom Party, 1994–2001; 2004–2015)
 Republic of Madagascar (Association for the Rebirth of Madagascar, 1997–2002)
 Russian Federation (Communist Party of the Russian Federation, 1998–1999)
 Republic of Moldova (Party of Communists of the Republic of Moldova, 2001–2009)
 Federative Republic of Brazil (Workers' Party, 2002–2016)
 Oriental Republic of Uruguay (Socialist Party of Uruguay, 2005–2010; 2015–2020 and Movement of Popular Participation 2010–2015)
 Republic of Sierra Leone (All People's Congress, 2007–2018)
 Republic of Cyprus (Progressive Party of Working People, 2008–2013)
 Republic of El Salvador (Farabundo Martí National Liberation Front, 2009–2019)
 Republic of Suriname (National Democratic Party, 2010–2020)

See also

List of anarchist communities
Communist state
People's republic
Socialism in one country
State socialism

Notes

References

Communist states
Socialist
States
States